The University of Applied Sciences in Business Administration Zurich (HWZ) is the oldest and biggest part-time University for economics and Business Administration in Switzerland and is a part of the Zurich University of Applied Sciences.

History
It was founded in 1986 as the part-time HWV Zurich (University for Economics and Administration) by the KV Switzerland and the Juventus Schools Foundation of Zurich.

Location
The HWZ is situated in the modern “Sihlhof” right in the heart of Zurich, 3 minutes from the main railway station.

Keys
 Member of the Universities of Applied Sciences of Zurich (ZFH)
 Accredited by the Federal Office for Professional Education and Technology (OPET) 
 Private and independent
 Full suite of courses: bachelor, masters, doctorate and other courses
 International academic network and partners from the business world
 Practical work by the students and lecturers
 Active Alumni Association with more than 2,500 members

See also
List of largest universities by enrollment in Switzerland

References

External links 
 Information about HWZ - Switzerland (Zurich University of Applied Sciences in Business Administration - Switzerland)

Universities of Applied Sciences in Switzerland
Education in Zürich
Educational institutions established in 1986
Educational institutions established in 1874
Business schools in Switzerland
1986 establishments in Switzerland
Schools in Zürich